Dalophis obtusirostris is an eel in the family Ophichthidae (worm/snake eels). It was described by Jacques Blache and Marie-Louise Bauchot in 1972. It is a tropical, marine eel which is known from the eastern Atlantic Ocean, including Mauritania and Senegal. It inhabits estuaries and forms burrows in sand or mud. Males can reach a maximum total length of 38.8 centimetres.

References

Ophichthidae
Taxa named by Jacques Blache
Taxa named by Marie-Louise Bauchot
Fish described in 1972